Ben Farrar (born 2 December 1986) is an Australian former professional rugby league footballer. He is the player/head coach of New York Rugby League. He previously played for the North Queensland Cowboys and Manly-Warringah Sea Eagles in the National Rugby League and the Catalans Dragons in the Super League.

Playing career
Born in Newcastle, New South Wales, Farrar played his junior football for the Western Suburbs Rosellas before being signed by the Newcastle Knights. He played for the Knights' S.G. Ball team in 2004, winning the 2004 S.G. Ball Cup Grand Final.

Parramatta Eels
In 2005, Farrar joined the Parramatta Eels, winning the Premier League Grand Final in 2006.

North Queensland Cowboys
In 2007, Farrar joined the North Queensland Cowboys. He played for the North Queensland Young Guns in the Queensland Cup.

In Round 7 of the 2007 NRL season, Farrar made his NRL début for the Cowboys against the Manly-Warringah Sea Eagles. He scored a try on debut.

Manly Sea Eagles
In 2009, after playing 38 games for the club, Farrar made a mid-season move to the Manly-Warringah Sea Eagles in a player swap for Michael Bani.

Catalans Dragons
On 14 September 2010, Farrar signed a 1-year contract with the Catalans Dragons in the Super League starting in 2011, alongside childhood teammate, Scott Dureau.

In 2011, Farrar signed a 2-year contract to return to the Manly-Warringah Sea Eagles in 2012. After two injury plagued seasons though, Farrar did not play a first-grade game.

London Broncos
In February 2014 Farrar signed a 2-year contract to play with the London Broncos in the Super League competition.

(For 2014 Super League season highlights, stats and results click on 2014 Super League season results)

New York Rugby League
After a period coaching the juniors & women's teams at Newcastle Knights it was announced in July 2022 that Farrar signed a contract to both play and coach New York Rugby League in the NARL competition.

Representative career
Farrar had played for the New South Wales U19's team.

Personal life
Farrar is the nephew of former Canterbury-Bankstown Bulldogs, Western Suburbs Magpies, Wigan Warriors and Illawarra Steelers player Andrew Farrar.

References

External links

1986 births
Living people
Australian rugby league players
Catalans Dragons players
London Broncos players
Manly Warringah Sea Eagles players
New York Freedom Rugby League coaches
New York Freedom Rugby League players
North Queensland Cowboys players
Rugby league centres
Rugby league five-eighths
Rugby league fullbacks
Rugby league players from Newcastle, New South Wales
Rugby league wingers
Western Suburbs Rosellas players